Diadegma anurum is a wasp first described by Carl Gustaf Thomson in 1887. No subspecies are listed.

References

anurum
Insects described in 1887